Jeong Bo-young (born 21 May 2003) is a South Korean tennis player.

Jeong has a career high WTA singles ranking of 688 achieved on 19 September 2022. She also has a career high WTA doubles ranking of 889 achieved on 19 September 2022.

Jeong made her WTA main draw debut at the 2022 Korea Open after receiving a wildcard for the singles main draw.

ITF Circuit finals

Doubles: 2 (2 runner–ups)

References

External links

2003 births
Living people
South Korean female tennis players
21st-century South Korean women